Harald Kolbeinson Guddal (1798–1887) was a Norwegian politician.

He was elected to the Norwegian Parliament in 1842, representing the rural constituency of Nordre Bergenhus Amt (today named Sogn og Fjordane). He worked as a farmer. He served only one term.

He hailed from Oppstryn, and was deputy mayor in Stryn municipality from 1837.

References

1798 births
1887 deaths
Members of the Storting
Sogn og Fjordane politicians
People from Stryn